Strand is a surname. Notable people with the surname include:

Asle Strand, Norwegian luger 
Andreas Strand (gymnast) (1889–1958), Norwegian gymnast in the 1908 Summer Olympics 
Anne Lilia Berge Strand, Norwegian artist and DJ 
Arne Strand, Norwegian journalist and politician for the Labour Party 
David Strand, American academic
Embrik Strand (1876–1947), Norwegian zoologist, entomologist and arachnologist
Hans E. Strand (1934–2000), Norwegian politician for the Conservative Party
Joakim Strand, Finnish politician
Johan Martin Jakobsen Strand  (1873–1935), Norwegian farmer and politician for the Liberal Party 
Kaj Aage Gunnar Strand, (1907–2000), a Danish astronomer
Kjetil Strand, Norwegian handball player
Knut Olaf Andreasson Strand (1887–1980), Norwegian politician for the Liberal Party  
Lars Iver Strand, Norwegian footballer 
Lars Ketil Strand (1924–2020), Norwegian forester 
Lasse Strand, Norwegian footballer
Mark Strand, an American poet
Morten Strand, Norwegian footballer and politician for the Conservative Party 
Odd Strand (1925–2008),  Norwegian civil servant 
Olaf Strand (1899–1997),  Norwegian middle distance runner 
Pål Strand, Norwegian footballer
Paul Strand, an American modernist photographer
Richard Strand, an American linguist studying Afghanistan
Roar Strand, Norwegian footballer 
Robert Ernest Strand, American farmer and politician
Thomas Strand (born 1954), Swedish politician
Tove Strand, Norwegian director and former politician for the Labour Party
Erik Welle-Strand (1916–2001), Norwegian mining engineer and World War II resistance member

Fictional characters
Karl Strand, a character in Westworld
Owen Strand, a character in 9-1-1: Lone Star
Sam Strand, a character in Death Stranding
T.K. Strand, a character in 9-1-1: Lone Star
Victor Strand, a character in Fear the Walking Dead